Emin Aladağ (born February 25, 1983 in Lüleburgaz) is a Turkish footballer who plays as a midfielder for Şile Yıldızspor.

Career
On 31 August 2016, he rejoined Bucaspor on a one-year contract. Aladağ then joined Kahramanmaraşspor in January 2018, and left the club one year later.

References

External links
 
 
 

1983 births
Living people
People from Lüleburgaz
Turkish footballers
Association football midfielders
İnegölspor footballers
Denizlispor footballers
Samsunspor footballers
Giresunspor footballers
Akhisarspor footballers
Süper Lig players